UFC 154: St-Pierre vs. Condit was a mixed martial arts pay-per-view event held by the Ultimate Fighting Championship on November 17, 2012, at the Bell Centre in Montreal, Quebec, Canada.

Background
Parent company Zuffa, LLC produced a UFC Primetime special to promote the title unification match main event. In addition, UFC 154 was shown in more than 350 movie theaters in the United States.

Fabio Maldonado was briefly linked to a bout with Cyrille Diabaté at the event. However, Maldonado was moved to UFC 153 to face Glover Teixeira.Chad Griggs ended up replacing Maldonado to face Diabaté.

Stephen Thompson was expected to face Besam Yousef at the event.  However, Thompson was forced out of the bout with a knee injury and was replaced by Matthew Riddle. Yousef was then forced out with injury, and replaced by John Maguire.

A bout between Nick Ring and Costas Philippou was expected to take place at this event. However, the fight was scrapped when Ring fell ill the day of the fight. As a result, Mark Bocek and Rafael Dos Anjos was moved to the main card.

Results

Bonus awards
Fighters were each awarded $70,000 bonuses:
Fight of the Night: Georges St. Pierre vs. Carlos Condit
Knockout of the Night: Johny Hendricks
Submission of the Night: Ivan Menjivar

See also
List of UFC events
2012 in UFC

References

External links
Official UFC past events page
UFC events results at Sherdog.com
St Pierre versus Condit

Ultimate Fighting Championship events
Mixed martial arts in Canada
Sports competitions in Montreal
2012 in mixed martial arts
2012 in Canadian sports
Events in Montreal